Sarah Wijnants (born 13 October 1999) is a Belgian footballer who plays as a forward for Anderlecht and the Belgium women's national football team (also known as the Belgian Red Flames).

Club career 
Wijnants started her career at the youth of NS Tervuren. She transfers in 2014 to Standard Liège. The season after she joined Standard Liège she made her first UEFA Champions League debut on 10 October 2015 against Frankfurt. The game was lost with 6–0. In the season 2015–16 She played in Super League as in the First Division and Standard won in both leagues the championship title. At the end of season 2016–17 Wijnants left Stander Liège to play for Anderlecht.

International career 
Wijnants played her first game with the Flames U15 on 26 March 2014 against the Netherlands. The game was lost 0–6. The same year, she played for the Flames U16 and U17. She made her first cap for the U16 on a tournament in Magglingen, Switzerland against Croatia. The game was won 0–4. Her last game for the U16 was on 7 May 2015 against Norway in Castro Verde, Portugal.

On 6 October 2014 she made her first cap with the U17 in a 3–0 victory against Latvia on which she scored the opening goal. This was the first goal as an international. She played in total 14 games and was able to score 3 goals. She played her last game for the U17 on 29 March 2015 against England, the game was lost 2–0. In 2016 she made her first cap for the U19 in a match against Ireland and won with 2–1. The friendly game was played in Tubize, Belgium on 19 September.

Wijnants made her first senior appearance in a friendly match against France in Clairefontaine on 19 January. She played 10 minutes and the game ended with a 1–2 victory. The Red Flames where invited to participate on the Cyprus Cup. Wijnants didn't made it to the selection at first but because of the injury of Laura de Neve she was called up in extremis for the selection.

Career statistics

Club

International 

Scores and results list Belgium's goal tally first, score column indicates score after each Wijnants goal.

Awards 
 2016–2017 Winner Super League Vrouwenvoetbal
 2015–2016 Winner Super League Vrouwenvoetbal
 2015–2016 Winner Belgian Women's First Division

References

External links
 
 Profile Standard Liège

1999 births
Living people
Belgian women's footballers
Belgium women's international footballers
Women's association football forwards
Footballers from Flemish Brabant
Standard Liège (women) players
RSC Anderlecht (women) players
Super League Vrouwenvoetbal players
UEFA Women's Euro 2022 players
Sportspeople from Leuven